33-61 Emerson Place Row is a set of historic rowhouses located at Buffalo in Erie County, New York.  It is one of a rare surviving group of speculative multi-unit frame residences designed to resemble rowhouses in the city of Buffalo.  It was built in 1893, by land dealer and speculator Benjamin B. Rice.  The seven unit row features decorative shingle sheathing and two-story bow windows.

It was listed on the National Register of Historic Places in 1986.

References

External links
33--61 Emerson Place Row - U.S. National Register of Historic Places on Waymarking.com

Residential buildings on the National Register of Historic Places in New York (state)
Queen Anne architecture in New York (state)
Houses completed in 1893
Houses in Buffalo, New York
Colonial Revival architecture in New York (state)
Shingle Style houses
Architecture of Buffalo, New York
National Register of Historic Places in Buffalo, New York
1893 establishments in New York (state)
Shingle Style architecture in New York (state)